"Someday We'll All Be Free" is a 1973 song by Donny Hathaway from the album Extension of a Man. The song was released as the flipside to the single "Love, Love, Love." Though the song was only released as an uncharted A-side, it is considered an R&B standard, having been covered by many artists over the years.

Background
The lyric was written by Edward Howard, for and about the mental pain that Hathaway, who was diagnosed with paranoid schizophrenia when the song was written, was experiencing at the time. Edward Howard said:

Years later, the song began to be interpreted as being written about black rights, primarily due to Spike Lee featuring Aretha Franklin's 1992 version at the end of his biographical film Malcolm X. However, as Howard said:

Donny Hathaway himself particularly loved the song and as Eulalah Hathaway stated:

Although the song did not chart, the B-side of the single, "Love, Love Love," peaked at #44 on the Billboard Hot 100 and #16 on the R&B charts<ref>[ Charts and Awards for Exenstion of a Man] on Allmusic; Retrieved 05-12-2010</ref>

Personnel
Donny Hathaway – lead vocals, Fender Rhodes electric piano, arrangements
Cornell Dupree – guitar
David Spinozza – guitar
Ray Lucas – drums
Willie Weeks – bass
Marvin Stamm – trumpet

Covers
Sérgio Mendes on his self-titled 1975 debut for Elektra Records.
Average White Band and Ben E. King on the 1977 album Benny and Us.
Bobby Womack covered the song on his 1985 album of the same name.
Regina Belle on her 1989 album Stay With MeJames Ingram on his 1989 album It's RealAretha Franklin covered the song in the soundtrack for the 1992 film Malcolm XTom Browne on his 1999 compilation album R 'N' Browne also with Dianne Reeves did as vocals.
Charlie Hunter covered this song as a solo instrumental on his self-titled 2000 Blue Note album.
Alicia Keys during the America: A Tribute to Heroes telethon following the September 11, 2001 terrorist attacks.
Take 6 on their 2002 album Beautiful World (this version is a duet with Hathaway's daughter, Lalah Hathaway).
Deniece Williams on her 2007 album Love, Niecy StyleGeorge Benson on his 2009 album Songs and StoriesKirk Whalum on his 2010 album Everything Is Everything: The Music Of Donny HathawayBen Allison on his 2011 album Action-RefractionCory Henry on his 2012 album Gotcha Now DocStéphane Belmondo on his 2013 album Ever AfterBilal during the Grand Performances series in Los Angeles with the Miguel Atwood-Ferguson Ensemble.
Helen Baylor covers the song which was used in the season 2 finale of the Martin episode, "Martin's on the Move", and the song appears during the closing credits of the previous seasons.
Jay-Z sampled the song in the track "Legacy" from his album 4:44John Legend did a cover of the song with team member Victor Solomon on The Voice Season 20 finale.
Ye, formerly known as Kanye West sampled Hathaway’s version on a 2022 song he released under the same title.

In popular culture
Hathaway's version was featured in an episode of AMC's The Walking Dead, in the seventh-season finale "The First Day of the Rest of Your Life", as the character Sasha ingests a cyanide pill.

Hathaway's version was also featured in Showtime's The Chi'', in the second-season finale "The Scorpion and the Frog" (episode #10) as the closing music.

References

1973 songs
Donny Hathaway songs
Songs about depression